Biss och Kajs (loosely translated from Swedish as "wee-wee" and "poo-poo", with initials 'B' and 'K' notably swapped for apparent creative purposes making them sound like characters) is a Swedish educational TV show explaining to children their bodily functions. It was shown as an example of Western decadence in a programme of the Russian state TV channel Rossiya 1 in November 2013, during the negotiations of the Association Agreement between the European Union and Ukraine. According to Rossiya 1 anchor Dmitriy Kiselev, "it exemplifies the kind of Western decadence that awaits Ukraine if it decides to join the EU and turn its back on Russia."

References

External links 
Biss och Kajs at the website of Sveriges Television 

Swedish children's television series
Swedish television shows featuring puppetry